Kesava Kiran (born 16 February 1989 in Hyderabad, India) is an Indian music director and composer. He made his debut in the Telugu film Mooga Manasulu in 2013.

Early life
Kesava Kiran was very passionate towards music from his childhood. At the age of 6 he started experimenting with musical instruments, observing this his uncle Rajasekhar, who is a Singer and Guitarist encouraged Kesava Kiran and dat is how his musical journey started. Kesava Kiran had given many music performances along with his friends from his school days and gradually his passion towards music made him to set his career in the music field. His mainstream instruments were rhythms and keyboard.

Career

Kesava Kiran has composed an album named Ennallila, in 2011 produced by his friend Eashan Praveen which was released by Aditya Music and got huge applause from the listeners and even became a milestone in his career because impressed by this work, he was introduced to MR.Productions by Sahithi Vangara (lyricist). MR.Productions liked Kesava Kiran's music and requested him to compose music for their short film "unfortunately" it is how he composed the song "Edho Maaya" which was an instant hit. Since then he composed music for many short films for various Production houses. He used the music website for artists, ReverbNation and topped the Reggae/Film Score charts with Rank #1 for India. Feature Film makers approached Kesava Kiran after Listening to the song "Challaga" from one of his short film, to compose music for a Telugu feature film, Mooga Manasulu Directed by Mahesh Kanakala & Lyrics were written by Anantha Sreeram. Audio of Mooga Manasulu was released on 24 March 2013 through Aditya Music and met with high acclaim and praise topping the charts and has been rated 9/10 on many websites  He has also contributed his vocals for a song "Em Chebutha" which is a duet with Geeta Madhuri in the film . He started his music career in 2012 and till today, he composed music for more than 150 Projects which include Feature films, Short films, Jingles, Singles and few private albums. He has won Best Music Director Award for "Its a Girl issue" Short film from shortfilmsintelugu.in.

Kesava Kiran Composed Music for a Promotional Song for the Movie Sardaar Gabbar Singh (Fan Made), which was released on 6 March 2016, started trending online instantly and became online sensation. His second promotional song for the movie Janatha Garage (Fan Made) has got more than 250K views on YouTube. Both the songs were penned by Kishore Babu Sambangi.

Discography

Feature films

Short films as a music director

Video/singles

Album

Ads

External links
Official Website: http://www.kesavakiran.com

Challaga https://www.youtube.com/watch?v=_ijjOT8Hk-U
Sambar Idly https://www.youtube.com/watch?v=9KVci2ukj2o
Unfortunately https://www.youtube.com/watch?v=kaLrBGf_8Do
Love Logic Less https://www.youtube.com/watch?v=gkGCstv166w
Proposal https://www.youtube.com/watch?v=5CXdlMSAByw
Group on Facebook https://www.facebook.com/groups/397200107028831/?fref=ts
Page in Facebook https://www.facebook.com/KesavaKiranMusic

References

1989 births
Music directors
Musicians from Hyderabad, India
Living people